Bridge of the Twenty-Three Camels is the official name of the highway bridge over the Fraser River at Lillooet, British Columbia, Canada, on BC Highway 99. It replaced the older 1913-vintage Lillooet Suspension Bridge, just upstream, which had no highway designation but connected the town to BC Highway 12, a designation which today only refers to the Lillooet-Lytton highway but, until the extension of the 99 designation from Pemberton, also included the Lillooet-Cache Creek highway.

As something of a joke on this name, the crossing of the Yalakom River at Moha, a small concrete truss span, sports the sign "Bridge of the Twenty-Three Chipmunks".

The bridge was opened on June 26, 1981 by Transportation and Highways Minister Alex Fraser and Thomas Waterland, Minister of Forests and the MLA for Yale-Lillooet.

See also
 List of crossings of the Fraser River
 List of bridges in Canada
Lytton Ferry
Pavilion Ferry
Low Bar Ferry
Cariboo camels

References

Fraser Canyon
Bridges over the Fraser River
Lillooet Country
Road bridges in British Columbia